The TREE-META (or Tree Meta, TREEMETA) Translator Writing System is a compiler-compiler system for context-free languages originally developed in the 1960s.  Parsing statements of the metalanguage resemble augmented Backus–Naur form with embedded tree-building directives. Unparsing rules include extensive tree-scanning and code-generation constructs.

History
TREE-META was instrumental in the development of NLS (oN-Line System) and was ported to many systems including the UNIVAC 1108, GE 645, SDS 940, ICL 1906A, PERQ, and UCSD p-System.

Example
This is a complete example of a TREE-META program extracted (and untested) from the more complete (declarations, conditionals, and blocks) example in Appendix 6 of the ICL 1900 TREE-META manual. That document also has a definition of TREE-META in TREE-META in Appendix 3.  This program is not just a recognizer, but also outputs the assembly language for the input.  It demonstrates one of the key features of TREE-META, which is tree pattern matching.  It is used on both the LHS (GET and VAL for example) and the RHS (ADD and SUB).

% This is an ALGOL-style comment delimited by %
% ====================== INPUT PARSE RULES ======================= %

.META PROG 
% A program defining driving rule is required.                     %
% This PROG rule is the driver of the complete program.            %

PROG  = $STMT ;
% $ is the zero or more operator.                                  %
% PROG (the program) is defined as zero or more STMT (statements). %

STMT = .ID ':=' AEXP :STORE[2]*;
% Parse an assignment statement from the source to the tree.       % 
% ':=' is a string constant, :STORE creates a STORE node,          %
% [2] defines this as having two branches i.e. STORE[ID,AEXP].     %
% * triggers a unparse of the tree, Starting with the last created %
% tree i.e. the STORE[ID,AEXP] which is emitted as output and      %
% removed from the tree.                                           %

AEXP = FACTOR $('+' FACTOR :ADD[2] / '-' FACTOR :SUB[2]);
% Here we have the recognizer for arithmetic '+' :ADD and '-' :SUB %
% tree building. Again the [2] creates a 2-branch ADD or SUB tree. %
% Unparsing is deferred until an entire statement has been parsed. %
% ADD[FACTOR,FACTOR] or SUB[FACTOR,FACTOR]                         %

FACTOR = '-' PRIME :MINUSS[1] / PRIME ;

PRIME =  .ID / .NUM / '(' AEXP ')' ?3? ;
% ?3? is a hint for error messages.                                %
    
% ===================== OUTPUT UNPARSE RULES ===================== %

STORE[-,-] => GET[*2] 'STORE ' *1 ;
% *1 is the left tree branch. *2 is the right                      %
% GET[*2] will generate code to load *2.                           %
% The 'STORE' string will be output                                %
% followed by left branch *1 a symbol                              %
% Whatever *2, it will be loaded by GET[*2].                       %

GET[.ID] => 'LOAD ' *1 /
   [.NUM] => ' LOADI ' *1 /
   [MINUSS[.NUM]] => 'LOADN ' *1:*1 /
   [-]  => *1 ;
% Here an .ID or a .NUM will simply be loaded. A MINUSS node       %
% containing a .NUM will have this used, the notation *1:*1 means  %
% the first branch (a .NUM) of the first branch (MINUSS).          %
% Anything else will be passed on for node recognition             %
% The unparse rules deconstruct a tree outputing code.             %

ADD[-,-] =>  SIMP[*2] GET[*1] 'ADD' VAL[*2]  / 
             SIMP[*1] GET[*2] 'ADD' VAL[*1] / 
             GET[*1] 'STORE T+' < OUT[A] ; A<-A+1 > /
             GET[*2] 'ADD T+' < A<-A-1 ; OUT[A] > ;
% Chevrons < > indicate an arithmetic operation, for example to    %
% generate an offset A relative to a base address T.               %

SUB[-,-]  => SIMP[*2] GET[*1] 'SUB' VAL[*2] / 
             SIMP[*1] GET[*2] 'NEGATE' % 'ADD' VAL[*1] /
             GET[*2] 'STORE T+' < OUT[A] ; A<-A+1 > / 
             GET[*1] 'SUB T+' < A<-A-1 ; OUT[A] > ;
% A percent character in an unparse rule indicates a newline.      %

SIMP[.ID]           => .EMPTY /
    [.NUM]          => .EMPTY /
    [MINUSS[.NUM]]  => .EMPTY;

VAL[.ID]             => ' ' *1 /
   [.NUM]            => 'I ' *1 /
   [MINUSS[.NUM]]    => 'N ' *1:*1 ;

MINUSS[-]            => GET[*1] 'NEGATE' ;

.END

See also
NLS (computer system)
META II

References 

 C. Stephen Carr, David A. Luther, Sherian Erdmann, The TREE-META Compiler-Compiler System: A Meta Compiler System for the Univac 1108 and General Electric 645, University of Utah Technical Report RADC-TR-69-83.
 , also  1968 Tech Report by Englebart, English, and Rulifson on Tree Meta's use in what they called Special-Purpose Languages (SPL's), which we now call Domain Specific Languages (DSL's), in the NLS.
 Donald I. Andrews, J. F. Rulifson (1967). Tree Meta (Working Draft): A Meta Compiler for the SDS 940, Stanford Research Institute, Menlo Park, CA. Engelbart Collection, Stanford University Archive, M 638, Box 16, Folder 3.
 ANDREWS, LEHTMAN, and WHP. "Tree Meta – a metacompiler for the Augmentation Research Center". Preliminary draft, 25 March 1971.
 Alan C. Kay The Reactive Engine Ph.D. thesis 1969 University of Utah. Notes that Henri Gouraud did the FLEX compiler in TREE-META on the SRI (Engelbart) SDS-940.
 Atlas Computer Laboratory quarterly report (21 November 1975), F. R. A. Hopgood documents work using TREE-META to create a compiler generating FR80 assembler output.
 Atlas Computer Laboratory quarterly report (12 October 1973), C. J. Pavelin documents (section 4.10) TREE-META being ported to the 1906A.
 TREE-META: a meta-compiler for the Interdata Model 4 by W. M. Newman. Queen Mary College, London. November 1972.

External links 
 Manual for ICL 1900 version of TREE-META by F R A Hopgood.
 Home page for collecting information about TREE-META
 TREE META Draft Document December, 1967 at bitsavers.org
 TREE META Release Document April, 1968 at bitsavers.org
 STUDY FOR THE DEVELOPMENT OF HUMAN INTELLECT AUGMENTATION TECHNIQUES by D. C. Engelbart
 Implementation of TREE-META in C (based on the version of TREE-META for the ICL 1900) 
 A revival of the TREE-META compiler-compiler.

1960s software
Parser generators
Programming languages
Domain-specific programming languages
SRI International software